A vulture is a bird of prey that scavenges on carrion. There are 23 extant species of vulture (including Condors). Old World vultures include 16 living species native to Europe, Africa, and Asia; New World vultures are restricted to North and South America and consist of seven identified species, all belonging to the Cathartidae family.
A particular characteristic of many vultures is a bald, unfeathered head. This bare skin is thought to keep the head clean when feeding, and also plays an important role in thermoregulation.

Vultures have been observed to hunch their bodies and tuck in their heads in the cold, and open their wings and stretch their necks in the heat. They also urinate on themselves as a means of cooling their bodies.

A group of vultures in flight is called a 'kettle', while the term 'committee' refers to a group of vultures resting on the ground or in trees. A group of vultures that are feeding is termed a 'wake'.

Taxonomy 
Although New World vultures and Old World vultures share many resemblances, they are not very closely related. Rather, they share resemblance because of convergent evolution.

Early naturalists placed all vultures under one single biological group. Carl Linnaeus had assigned both Old World vultures and New World vultures in a Vultur genus, even including the harpy eagle. Soon anatomists split Old and New World vultures, with New World vultures being placed in a new suborder, Cathartae, later renamed Cathartidae as per the Rules of Nomenclature (from Greek: carthartes, meaning "purifier") by French ornithologist Frédéric de Lafresnaye. The suborder was later recognised as a family, rather than a suborder.

In the late 20th century some ornithologists argued that New World vultures are more closely related to storks on the basis of karyotype, morphological, and behavioral data. Thus some authorities placed them in the Ciconiiformes family with storks and herons; Sibley and Monroe (1990) even considered them a subfamily of the storks. This was criticized, and an early DNA sequence study was based on erroneous data and subsequently retracted. There was then an attempt to raise the New World vultures to the rank of an independent order, Cathartiformes not closely associated with either the birds of prey or the storks and herons.

Old World 

The Old World vultures found in Africa, Asia, and Europe belong to the family Accipitridae, which also includes eagles, kites, buzzards, and hawks. Old World vultures find carcasses exclusively by sight.

The 16 species in 9 genera are:
 Cinereous vulture, Aegypius monachus
 Griffon vulture, Gyps fulvus
 White-rumped vulture, Gyps bengalensis
 Rüppell's vulture, Gyps rueppelli
 Indian vulture, Gyps indicus
 Slender-billed vulture, Gyps tenuirostris
 Himalayan vulture, Gyps himalayensis
 White-backed vulture, Gyps africanus
 Cape vulture, Gyps coprotheres
 Hooded vulture, Necrosyrtes monachus
 Red-headed vulture, Sarcogyps calvus
 Lappet-faced vulture, Torgos tracheliotos
 White-headed vulture, Trigonoceps occipitalis
 Bearded vulture (Lammergeier), Gypaetus barbatus
 Egyptian vulture, Neophron percnopterus
 Palm-nut vulture, Gypohierax angolensis

New World 

The New World vultures and condors found in warm and temperate areas of the Americas belong to the family Cathartidae. Recent DNA evidence suggests that they should be included within order Accipitriformes along with birds of prey including hawks, eagles, and Old World vultures. Several species have a good sense of smell, unusual for raptors, and are able to smell dead animals from great heights, up to a mile away. The seven species are:

 Black vulture Coragyps atratus in South America and north to the US
 Turkey vulture Cathartes aura throughout the Americas to southern Canada
 Lesser yellow-headed vulture Cathartes burrovianus in South America and north to Mexico
 Greater yellow-headed vulture Cathartes melambrotus in the Amazon Basin of tropical South America
 California condor Gymnogyps californianus in California, formerly widespread in the mountains of western North America
 Andean condor Vultur gryphus in the Andes
 King vulture Sarcoramphus papa from southern Mexico to northern Argentina

Feeding 

Vultures are scavengers, meaning that they eat dead animals. Outside of the oceans, vultures are the only known obligate scavengers. They rarely attack healthy animals, but may kill the wounded or sick. When a carcass has too thick a hide for its beak to open, it waits for a larger scavenger to eat first. Vast numbers have been seen upon battlefields. They gorge themselves when prey is abundant, until their crops bulge, and sit, sleepy or half torpid, to digest their food. These birds do not carry food to their young in their talons but disgorge it from their crops. The mountain-dwelling bearded vulture is the only vertebrate to specialize in eating bones; it carries bones to the nest for the young, and hunts some live prey.

Vultures are of great value as scavengers, especially in hot regions. Vulture stomach acid is exceptionally corrosive (pH=1.0), allowing them to safely digest putrid carcasses infected with botulinum toxin, hog cholera bacteria, and anthrax bacteria that would be lethal to other scavengers and remove these bacteria from the environment. New World vultures often vomit when threatened or approached. Contrary to some accounts, they do not "projectile vomit" on their attacker in defence, but to lighten their stomach load to ease take-off. The vomited meal residue may distract a predator, allowing the bird to escape.

New World vultures also urinate straight down their legs; the uric acid kills bacteria accumulated from walking through carcasses, and also acts as evaporative cooling.

Conservation status 

Vultures in south Asia, mainly in India and Nepal, have declined dramatically since the early 1990s. It has been found that this decline was caused by residues of the veterinary drug Diclofenac in animal carcasses. The government of India has taken very late cognizance of this fact and has banned the drug for animals. It may take decades for vultures to come back to their earlier population level, if ever. Without them to pick corpses clean, rabid dogs have multiplied, feeding on the carrion, and age-old practices like the sky burials of the Parsees are coming to an end, permanently reducing the supply of corpses. The same problem is also seen in Nepal where government has taken some late steps to conserve remaining vultures.

The vulture population is threatened across Africa and Eurasia. There are many anthropogenic activities that threaten vultures such as poisoning and wind energy collision mortality. In Central Africa there have been efforts to conserve the remaining vultures and bring their population numbers back up. The substantial drop in vulture populations in the continent of Africa is also said to be the result of both intentional and unintentional poisoning, with one study finding it to be the cause of 61% of the vulture deaths recorded.

A recent study in 2016, reported that "of the 22 vulture species, nine are critically endangered, three are endangered, four are near threatened, and six are least concern".

The conservation status of vultures is of particular concern to humans. For example, the decline of vulture populations can lead to increased disease transmission and resource damage, through increased populations of disease vector and pest animal populations that scavenge carcasses opportunistically. Vultures control these pests and disease vectors indirectly through competition for carcasses.

On 20 June 2019, the corpses of 468 white-backed vultures, 17 white-headed vultures, 28 hooded vultures, 14 lappet-faced vultures and 10 cape vultures, altogether 537 vultures, besides 2 tawny eagles, were found in northern Botswana. It is suspected that they died after eating the corpses of three elephants that were poisoned by poachers, possibly to avoid detection by the birds, which help rangers to track poaching activity by circling above where there are dead animals.

In myth and culture 

In Ancient Egyptian art, Nekhbet, a mythological goddess and patron of both the city of Nekheb and Upper Egypt was depicted as a vulture. Alan Gardiner identified the species that was used in divine iconography as a griffon vulture. Arielle P. Kozloff argues that the vultures in New Kingdom art, with their blue-tipped beaks and loose skin, better resemble the lappet-faced vulture. Many Great Royal Wives wore vulture crowns - a symbol of protection from the goddess Nekhbet.

Ancient Egyptians believed that all vultures were female and were spontaneously born from eggs without the intervention of a male, and therefore linked the birds to purity and motherhood, but also the eternal cycle of death and rebirth for their ability to transform the “death” they feed on – i.e. carrion and waste – into life.

In Pre-Columbian times, vultures were appreciated as extraordinary beings and had high iconographic status. They appear in many Mesoamerican myths, legends, and fables from civilizations such as the Maya and Aztecs, some depicting them negatively, others positively.

See also 

 Jatayu
 Stele of the Vultures

References

External links 

 Vulture videos on the Internet Bird Collection
 Ventana Wildlife Society 
 Vulture observatory in Spain
 A Vulture Restaurant
 Declining Vulture Count in India
 Vulture Conservation in Western Coast of India
 Website for journal Vulture News

01
Birds of prey
Scavengers
Bird common names
Polyphyletic groups